The angular angelshark or Squantina guggenheim are sharks of the Squantina genus in the Squantinidae family. They originate in Brazil and Argentina, while living in marine, brackish and demersal environments at depth of approximately 4-360m. Their typical food sources consist of bony fish, crustaceans, and mollusks.

Morphology 
The Squantina Guggenheim is shaped like a ray and in males, a spiny surface is located on its pectoral fins. However, this spiny surface is absent in females and younglings. This spiny structure is thought to help hold females while mating. Typically, both males and females range 89-130cm in length. Squantina Guggenheim approximately have 18-22 teeth in the upper and lower jaw.

Life Cycle 
The Squantina Guggenheim like some Chondrichthyes is ovoviviparous, however the females left ovary is only functional and the embryos use the yolk as nutrition during the pregnancy. The right ovary has been found to have very little oocytes and is ineffective. Typically, females will carry for 9-12 months and have approximately 3-9 pups in shallow waters.

Distribution 
Squantina Guggenheim is found primarily in the Southwestern Atlantic. Specifically, they are located in Argentina and southern Brazil. This area is a subtropical zone and is at a latitude of 20°S - 45°S and a longitude of 68°W - 40°W. Typically, Squantina Guggenheim are found in sandy or muddy areas of the ocean floors.

Conservation 
Currently, Squantina Guggenheim is an endangered species due to overfishing and are more susceptible due to the fact they are bottom dwellers. In addition, it may be possible females leave their young earlier on due to the stresses induced from fishing. Currently, Brazil has not taken any action in helping restore this species population.

References
 

angular angelshark
Fish of Uruguay
Fish of the Western Atlantic
angular angelshark